The DILG-NAPOLCOM Center is a 27-story government building situated along the corner of Quezon Avenue and EDSA in Quezon City, Metro Manila, Philippines. It is besides The Skysuites Tower.

Building
The main tenants of the DILG-NAPOLCOM Center as its name suggest is the Department of the Interior and Local Government (DILG) and the National Police Commission (NAPOLCOM). The DILG moved to the building in June 2013 while the NAPOLCOM transferred to the building from its previous office in Makati in May 2014.

The 27-story building hosts an executive lounge, cafeteria, a roof deck, and a helipad. Eight levels are allotted as parking area which has the capacity of 250 vehicles.

The Megaworld Corporation was involved in the construction of the building as part of the company's  deal with NAPOLCOM.

References

Department of the Interior and Local Government (Philippines)
Buildings and structures in Quezon City
Government buildings in the Philippines